Bean tree is a name used in different parts of the world for various trees that carry their seeds in large pods. Examples include:

 Carob
 Catalpa
 Cassia brewsteri
 Cassia tomentella
 Erythrina vespertilio (Bat's wing coral tree, grey corkwood)
 Castanospermum australe
 Lysiphyllum carronii